Alayna Burns (born 25 January 1980) is an Australian track cyclist.

Burns competed at the 1998 Commonwealth Games winning a gold medal in the women's points race and a silver medal in the women's 3000m individual pursuit event.

She competed at the 2000 Summer Olympics in Sydney in the Women's individual pursuit event and the Women's points race.

References

External links
 
 
 
 

1980 births
Living people
Sportspeople from Mackay, Queensland
Australian female cyclists
Olympic cyclists of Australia
Cyclists at the 2000 Summer Olympics
Cyclists at the 1998 Commonwealth Games
Commonwealth Games gold medallists for Australia
Commonwealth Games silver medallists for Australia
Commonwealth Games medallists in cycling
20th-century Australian women
21st-century Australian women
Medallists at the 1998 Commonwealth Games